Sparrows Point High is a comprehensive high school for students in grades 9–12 and is one of the 24 high schools in the Baltimore County Public Schools. The current enrollment is 795 with 27.6–29.0 students per class. The school was established in 1908 and is located on a  campus in the southeastern corner of Baltimore County on a peninsula, which juts out into the Chesapeake Bay. The staff includes three administrators, 60 teachers, three guidance counselors, one librarian, eight instructional assistants, and four clerical personnel. Sparrows Point High is fully accredited by the Middle States Association of Colleges and Secondary Schools and by the Maryland State Department of Education. The school's colors are blue and gray and the mascot is the "Pointer".

Each year, approximately 85% of the graduates elect to continue their education.

Academics
Sparrows Point High school received a 60.7 out of a possible 90 points (67%) on the 2018-2019 Maryland State Department of Education Report Card and received a 4 out of 5 star rating, ranking in the 65th percentile among all Maryland schools.

Students
The 2019–2020 enrollment at Sparrows Point High School was 1067 students.

Special programs

S.P.E.C.I.E.S.
SPECIES, (Sparrows Point Educational Center in Environmental Studies) is a magnet program for students with particularly intense interest in science. Magnet students are recruited throughout the eastern half of Baltimore County. The program provides in-depth experiences in a wide variety of aquatic and environmentally related sciences. Courses offering college credit are part of the SPECIES Program.

College credit
College credit is earned every year by students who take the Advanced Placement exams. Additionally, juniors and seniors may attend classes for half of each day at The Community College of Baltimore County. Students in this program may earn as many as fifteen college credits before they graduate from high school.

Sollers Point Technical High
Approximately 20 percent of the students attend Sollers Point Technical High School for half of each school day to gain technical skills. Various other vocational programs are available, several of which culminate in cooperative work-study experience.

Special needs
A Maryland's Tomorrow program is available for at-risk students and a special education program is offered for learning-disabled students.

Extracurricular programs
Many programs exist for Sparrows Point students beyond the regular curriculum. A complete interscholastic athletic program is offered that includes fall, winter, and spring sports.  Students publish a literary magazine, newspaper, and yearbook. Chapters of the National Honor Society, the National Art Honor Society, the National Science Honor Society, and the National Music Honor Society are all active at Sparrows Point, as are Future Business Leaders of America, Future Educators of America, and Students Against Destructive Decisions (SADD). The Student Government gives students opportunities to gain leadership experience. Instrumental and vocal music ensembles are also available. FUSION, an independent Christian-based after school program, has had a presence at Sparrows Point since 2009.

Athletics

State championships
Boys Cross Country:
Class B 1973
Girls Soccer
1A 2013, 2014, 2015, 2016, 2017, 2018
Boys Soccer
Class B 1973, 1974, 1975
1A 2006 (TIE), 2017
Pre-MPSSAA:
Combined Class 1920, 1927
Class A 1946
Boys Basketball
Class A 1961
Baseball
Class B 1979
Tennis
1A 2019

Notable alumni
 William T. Evans (Class of 1943), member of the Maryland House of Delegates and judge
 Roger B. Hayden (Class of 1962) - Hall of Fame (inducted 2016) - County Executive of Baltimore County, Maryland (1990–1994)
 John A. Olszewski Jr. (Class of 2000) - Hall of Fame (inducted 2016) - Member of the Maryland House of Delegates (2006- )
 Ron Swoboda (Class of 1962) - Hall of Fame (inducted 2014) - Outfielder for the New York Mets; was the "star" in the 1969 World Series defeat of the Orioles

Principals
Joseph Blair (1908–1931)
Benjamin Willis (1931–1932)
Austin Wheeler (1932–1940)
William Sartorius (1940–1942)
Taylor Johnston (1942–1947)
William Jones (1947–1948)
Nelson Hurley (1948–1956)
Paul Dowling (1956–1963)
Howard Ritter (1963–1967)
Anthony Marchione (1967–1970)
Wayne Burgemeister (1970–1977)
Dr. Michael Eder (1977–1984)
Nicholas Spinnato (1984–1990)
Keith Harmeyer (1991–1994)
Dr. Margaret Spicer (1994–1998)
Harold Hatton (1998–1999)
Wayne Thibeault (1999–2001)
Robert SantaCroce (2002–2012)
Samuel Wynkoop (2012-2015)
Emily Caster (2015–Present)

References

External links
 
 Sparrows Point High School Profile
 Baltimore County Public Schools

Educational institutions established in 1908
Educational institutions established in 1963
Public high schools in Maryland
Magnet schools in Maryland
Baltimore County Public Schools
Middle States Commission on Secondary Schools
Sparrows Point, Maryland
1908 establishments in Maryland
1963 establishments in Maryland